Stylosanthes scabra, the shrubby stylo, is a species of flowering plant in the family Fabaceae, native to tropical South America, and introduced to Hawaii and Australia. It is widely planted as a droughttolerant livestock forage.

References

scabra
Forages
Flora of Venezuela
Flora of western South America
Flora of Brazil
Flora of Paraguay
Flora of Northwest Argentina
Flora of Northeast Argentina
Plants described in 1838